Kate Walsh (born 17 June 1981) is an English businesswoman and former reality television contestant who came to the public's attention in March 2009 whilst appearing as a candidate in the fifth series of The Apprentice. She co-hosted the Channel 5 evening entertainment show Live from Studio Five from its launch in September 2009 until the final edition on 4 February 2011. She also presented the Live from Studio Five replacement OK! TV after original host Denise van Outen pulled out of the role three days before the programme's launch. Walsh left the show on 16 August 2011 along with co-host Matt Johnson.

Early life
Walsh attended Blake Valley Technology College and has a BSc degree in Psychology and Management from Aston University, Birmingham.

The Apprentice
In 2009, Walsh took part in Series 5 of The Apprentice where she competed for a job working for Alan Sugar. She finished as runner-up to Yasmina Siadatan.

TV presenting career
After her stint on The Apprentice, Walsh hosted a women's fashion segment on GMTV, appearing for a number of episodes.

In September 2009, Walsh joined Channel 5 to present Live from Studio Five. She presented the show alongside various co-presenters until its cancellation in February 2011. Walsh was the only presenter from the original line-up to remain with the programme from its launch.

Walsh returned to Channel 5 to co-present the new entertainment show, OK! TV from 14 February 2011 to August 2011.

Personal life
Walsh lived in Hednesford in Cannock but moved to London to live with fellow Apprentice contestant, Philip Taylor.

Filmography

References

External links

1981 births
Living people
English television presenters
People from Hednesford
The Apprentice (British TV series) candidates